The 12275 / 12276 Prayagraj Junction railway station - New Delhi Humsafar Express (also known as Prayagraj Humsafar Express) is a Superfast Express train of the Humsafar Express category belonging to Indian Railways - North Central Railway zone that runs between Prayagraj Junction railway station and New Delhi in India. It is the seventh-fastest-running train in India. Earlier it used to run as 12275/76 Allahabad - New Delhi Duronto Express of Duronto Express category from 9 February 2010 to 14 September 2019 before being converted to Humsafar Express.

It is operated as train number 12275 from Prayagraj Junction to New Delhi and as train number 12276 in the reverse direction serving the states of Uttar Pradesh & Delhi.

Coaches 

Earlier the 12275 / 76 Allahabad - New Delhi had Duronto Express Coaches. This Train is now replaced with Prayagraj Junction railway station - New Delhi Humsafar Express with effect from 13 September 2019. The train comprises 14 3-tier AC, 4 Sleeper LHB coach along with two generator cars at each end. It has two screens in each coach displaying information about upcoming stations and passenger awareness. It is also equipped with CCTV cameras in each coach to ensure passenger safety. It is the 1st Humsafar Express which is having Sleeper Coaches since Humsafar Express is a full AC 3 Tier Train. These are state of the art coaches and are superior to the previous rake of Duronto Express which is now removed on railways exercise of upgradation and giving passengers a more convenient travel on peak routes.

Coach composition for 12275 :

Coach composition for 12276 :

It is having a rake sharing arrangement with 22437/38 Prayagraj Anand Vihar Humsafar Express.

Time Table

Time Table

Service

The 12275 Prayagraj- New Delhi Humsafar Express covered the distance of 635 kilometres in 07 hours 40 mins (83 km/hr) & in 07 hours 50 mins as 12276 New Delhi - Prayagraj Humsafar Express (81 km/hr).

As the average speed of the train was above , as per Indian Railways rules, its fare included a Superfast surcharge.

Routeing & Technical Halts

The 12275 / 12276 Prayagraj Junction railway station - New Delhi Humsafar Express has one Technical Halt at Tundla Junction Where Bookings are not allowed. (The halt is only for Crew Change)  between Prayagraj junction railway station and New Delhi

Traction

As the route is fully electrified, it is powered by a Kanpur based HOG(Head-on Generator) enabled WAP 7 for its entire journey. 
Earlier it used to run by a Ghaziabad based WAP 5 as Duronto Express.

References 

https://indiarailinfo.com/train/timetable/7936/664/455#st

External links

Trains from Allahabad
Transport in Delhi
Humsafar Express trains
Rail transport in Delhi
Railway services introduced in 2010